Vista Alegre do Prata (lit. Joyous View of Silver) is a municipality of the northeastern part of the state of Rio Grande do Sul, Brazil. The population is 1,557 (2020 est.) in an area of 119.33 km². Its elevation is 562 m.

References

External links
http://www.citybrazil.com.br/rs/vistaalegretepalma/ 

Municipalities in Rio Grande do Sul